Bowden may refer to:

Places

Australia
 Bowden Island, one of the Family Islands in Queensland
 Bowden, South Australia, northwestern suburb of Adelaide
 Bowden railway station

Canada
 Bowden, Alberta, town in central Alberta

England
 Bowden, Ashprington, a historic estate in Devon
 Bowden, Yealmpton, a hamlet in Devon
 Bowden Hill, village in Wiltshire
 Great Bowden, village in Leicestershire
 Little Bowden, formerly a village in Northamptonshire, now part of Market Harborough in Leicestershire
 Bowdon, Greater Manchester, a suburb and electoral ward in the Metropolitan Borough of Trafford, Greater Manchester

Scotland
 Bowden, Scottish Borders, village in Roxburghshire

United States
 Bowden, West Virginia
 Bowden, Oklahoma

People
Bowden (surname)

Other
 Bowden Lithia water, a lithia water brand marketed by Judge Bowden in 1887
 Wilson Bowden, construction company
 Bowden cable

See also
 Boden (disambiguation)
 Bowdon (disambiguation)
 Bowen (disambiguation)